Krstoar (Macedonian Cyrillic: Крстоар) is a village  away from Bitola, which is the second-largest city in North Macedonia. It used to be part of the former municipality of Bistrica.

Demographics
Krstoar is attested in the Ottoman defter of 1467/68 as a village in the vilayet of Manastir. The inhabitants attested almost entirely bore typical Slavic anthroponyms, with one instance of the Albanian anthroponym Gjon (son of Janko) also present.

As of the 2021 census, Krstoar had 239 residents with the following ethnic composition:
Macedonians 200
Albanians 21
Persons for whom data are taken from administrative sources 11
Turks 5
Serbs 2

According to the 2002 census, the village had a total of 167 inhabitants. Ethnic groups in the village include:
Macedonians 164
Serbs 2
Others 1

Families 
Krstoar is a Macedonian village.
In 1951, families in village are:

Gjorevci (11 houses in village), Jonovci (8 houses), Kundevci (7 houses), Josifovci (3 houses), Cancukovci (3 houses), Mockovci (2 houses), Kotevi (2 houses) and Geldanovci (1 house) all of them natives in village; Sitnovci (4 houses) they settled from somewhere in 18 century; Vidinovci (8 houses) settled from Prespa; Gulevci (8 houses) settled from Albania; Mosheni (4 houses) settled from village Setina, near Florina; Domazetovci (2 houses) settled from Klobucista near Florina; Trifunovci (2 houses) settled from village Bukovo; Apostolovci (1 house) and Petrevci (1 house) they settled from somewhere; Milosevci (2 houses) settled after 1913 from Prespa, Ristovi(1 houses) settled from Bitola

References

Villages in Bitola Municipality
Albanian communities in North Macedonia